Paratirolites is a genus of Early Triassic ceratites from Armenia and Iran with distinct ribs, prominent ventro-lateral tubercles, and a broadly arched venter. The suture is ceratitic with a large ventral saddle. Ceratites are ammonoid cephalopods that lived during the Late Permian and Triassic.

Paratirolites is included in the Xenodiscoidean family Dzhulfitidae along with Abichites and Dzhulfites. Previously it was included in the Stephanitidae, a family belonging to the Ceratitoidea.

Species of Tirolites have also been found in the  Upper Permian of Azerbaijan, Thailand and Japan. and in the Triassic of Axerbaijan and Afghanistan.

References 

Triassic ammonites
Ceratitida genera
Fossils of Iran
Lopingian first appearances
Early Triassic extinctions
Xenodiscoidea